John Calverley "Jake" Milford (July 29, 1914 – December 24, 1984) was a general manager in the National Hockey League.

In the early sixties, Milford built the Brandon Wheat Kings of the Manitoba Junior Hockey League into a powerhouse winning three titles  in a row, and four in five years.

Milford was the general manager of the Los Angeles Kings from 1973 to 1977, where he led the Kings to a franchise record 105 points in a season.  After 1977, he went to manage the Vancouver Canucks, leading them to a Stanley Cup finals appearance in 1982.  He was then promoted to Senior Vice-President of the club, a position which he held until his sudden death on Christmas Eve 1984, just a month after his Hall of Fame induction.  For the remainder of the 1984–85 season, the Vancouver Canucks wore a "JCM" patch on their sweaters.

The coach of the year trophy in the Central Hockey League is named after Milford.

Milford died in 1984 of pancreatic cancer at Shaughnessy Hospital in Vancouver.

Awards and achievements 
Inducted into the Hockey Hall of Fame in 1984
Honoured Member of the Manitoba Hockey Hall of Fame

References

External links
 
Jake Milford's biography at Manitoba Hockey Hall of Fame

1914 births
1984 deaths
Canadian ice hockey left wingers
Cleveland Barons (1937–1973) players
Dallas Texans (USHL) players
Hockey Hall of Fame inductees
Ice hockey people from Prince Edward Island
Kenora Thistles players
Los Angeles Kings executives
National Hockey League general managers
New Haven Eagles players
Sportspeople from Charlottetown
Vancouver Canucks executives
Vancouver Canucks general managers
Wembley Monarchs players
Winnipeg Columbus Club players